Georgi Kasabov (born 6 October 1978) is a Bulgarian biathlete. He competed at the 1998 Winter Olympics and the 2002 Winter Olympics.

References

External links
 

1978 births
Living people
Bulgarian male biathletes
Olympic biathletes of Bulgaria
Biathletes at the 1998 Winter Olympics
Biathletes at the 2002 Winter Olympics
People from Samokov
Sportspeople from Sofia Province
20th-century Bulgarian people
21st-century Bulgarian people